There were three World Speed Skating Championships in the 2007 season:

 2007 World Allround Speed Skating Championships
 2007 World Sprint Speed Skating Championships
 2007 World Single Distance Speed Skating Championships

See also
2007 World Championships (disambiguation)